The Hansa was a Swedish passenger ship, in use on the route between the Swedish mainland and Visby. She was torpedoed and sunk by a Soviet submarine in 1944, during World War II.

Career and sinking
The Hansa was a passenger steamship built in Stockholm in 1899 for Ångfartygs AB Gotland, of Visby. She was built along luxury yacht lines and had dining room for 40 guests. In addition to sailing between the mainland and Visby, she also called at a number of other ports such as Danzig, Tallinn and Riga, during the 1930s.

On 24 November 1944, the Hansa was torpedoed and sunk between Nynäshamn and Visby by a Soviet submarine. At 05:57 a torpedo caused a large explosion, and the ship sank within a few minutes; 84 people died and two survived, including the then Swedish Army captain Arne Mohlin. The two survivors were rescued by the Swedish minesweepers Landsort and Arholma.  Investigations after the war pointed to the Soviet submarine L21 as being responsible for the sinking.

External links 
 

Ships built in Stockholm
1899 ships
Passenger ships of Sweden
Maritime incidents in November 1944
World War II shipwrecks in the Baltic Sea
Ships sunk by Soviet submarines
Gotland
Soviet Union–Sweden relations
1944 in Sweden
Sweden in World War II
Shipwrecks of Sweden